Shin Dong-bin (born February 14, 1956) is a Korean-Japanese businessman. He also has a Japanese name Akio Shigemitsu. As of 2012, he was CEO of the South Korean conglomerate Lotte Corporation and the Japanese Chiba Lotte Marines baseball team. He is the second son of Shin Kyuk-ho (Takeo Shigemitsu), founder and first CEO of Lotte and his Japanese wife. He is the younger brother of Hiroyuki Shigemitsu (Korean name Shin Dong-ju), CEO of the Japanese Lotte Group. He graduated from Aoyama Gakuin University with a B.A. in economics in 1977 and from Columbia University with an MBA.

He started his career at Nomura Securities' London branch in 1980 and joined Lotte in 1988, when he started at Lotte Chemical. In 2011, he became Chairman of Lotte Korea. Upon taking control of the group, Shin embarked on a series of M&As, including the acquisition of Hi-Mart, Hyundai Logistics, The New York Palace Hotel, and the chemical arm of Samsung - Samsung Fine Chemicals and Samsung BP Chemicals.

Shin was engaged in a number of disputes with his sibling, Shin Dong-ju, over the control of Lotte and gained control of the company after a long legal battle.

On December 22, 2017, a Seoul district court handed down to Shin a two-year suspension of a jail sentence with embezzlement and breach of trust in October 2016.

On February 13, 2018, Shin was sentenced to 30 months in prison after the Seoul Central District Court found him guilty of charges stemming from Lotte's decision to give ₩7 billion  (US$6.5 million) to Choi Soon-sil, a confidante of former President of South Korea Park Geun-hye, in exchange for government favors in providing a license to operate duty-free stores. On October 5, 2018, a South Korean appeals upheld Shin's conviction, but also agreed to suspend his sentence to time already served, thus setting him free.

Philanthropic activities 
Shin sits on the Board of Overseers of Columbia Business School. In 2013, he donated $4 million to the school to found the Shin Dong-bin fellowships. A professional skier, Shin also serves as the Chairman of the Korean Ski Association and pledged 60 billion won to the PyeongChang Olympics.

Personal life 
Shin is married to a Japanese woman named Ogo Manami, who is of aristocratic descent. The couple have three children, who all live in Japan. Both his office and his residence are located in Lotte World Tower, South Korea's tallest building.

References

South Korean chief executives
Lotte Corporation
Japanese people of South Korean descent
Aoyama Gakuin University alumni
Columbia Business School alumni
People from Tokyo
Zainichi Korean people
1956 births
Living people
Yeongsan Shin clan
South Korean fraudsters
South Korean people of Japanese descent
People convicted of embezzlement
Shin family
Recipients of South Korean presidential pardons